Miten Shah (born 7 March 1985) is an Indian cricketer. He made his Twenty20 debut for Baroda in the 2010–11 Syed Mushtaq Ali Trophy on 25 October 2010.

References

External links
 

1985 births
Living people
Indian cricketers
Baroda cricketers
People from Vadodara